Haugen Township is a township in Aitkin County, Minnesota, United States. The population was 178 at the 2010 census.

History
Haugen Township was named for county sheriff Christopher G. Haugen.

Geography

Lakes
 Island Lake (east three-quarters)
 Round Lake (east half)

Adjacent townships
 Balsam Township (north)
 Prairie Lake Township, St. Louis County (northeast)
 Beseman Township, Carlton County (east)
 Lakeview Township, Carlton County (southeast)
 Clark Township (south)
 McGregor Township (southwest)
 Shamrock Township (west)
 Turner Township (northwest)

Demographics
At the 2000 census, there were 163 people, 73 households and 50 families residing in the township. The population density was 4.6 per square mile (1.8/km). There were 198 housing units at an average density of 5.5/sq mi (2.1/km). The racial makeup of the township was 97.55% White, 1.84% Native American, and 0.61% from two or more races.

There were 73 households, of which 16.4% had children under the age of 18 living with them, 58.9% were married couples living together, 5.5% had a female householder with no husband present, and 31.5% were non-families. 24.7% of all households were made up of individuals, and 13.7% had someone living alone who was 65 years of age or older. The average household size was 2.23 and the average family size was 2.68.

16.6% of the population were under the age of 18, 6.7% from 18 to 24, 19.6% from 25 to 44, 29.4% from 45 to 64, and 27.6% who were 65 years of age or older. The median age was 50 years. For every 100 females, there were 111.7 males. For every 100 females age 18 and over, there were 119.4 males.

The median household income was $36,250 and the median family income was $43,750. Males had a median income of $26,250 and females $30,000. The per capita income was $20,246. About 10.4% of families and 8.2% of the population were below the poverty line, including none of those under the age of eighteen or sixty five or over.

References
 United States National Atlas
 United States Census Bureau 2007 TIGER/Line Shapefiles
 United States Board on Geographic Names (GNIS)

Townships in Aitkin County, Minnesota
Townships in Minnesota